Sixth Dimension is the sixth and final studio album by British power metal band Power Quest. It was released via Inner Wound Recordings on 13 October 2017. Two of its songs, "Face the Raven" and "Coming Home" were originally recorded for the Face the Raven EP released a year earlier. This is the only album the band released after reforming in 2016. Bassist Paul Finnie left the band after this album in 2018 and died in 2019.

Track listing

Personnel
Power Quest
 Steve Williams – keyboards
 Ashley Edison – vocals
 Andy Kopczyk – guitars
 Glyndwr Williams – guitars
 Paul Finnie – bass
 Rich Smith – drums

Additional musicians
 Anette Olzon – vocals (9)

Production
 Felipe Machado Franco – cover artwork

References

2017 albums
Power Quest albums
Napalm Records albums